Hugh Lafferty (16 November 1901 – 24 December 1970) was a Scottish association football half back who played professionally in Scotland, England and the United States.

Lafferty spent time with teams in both Scotland (St Johnstone) and England (Fulham), who later progressed to their countries' respective top divisions, before moving to the United States in 1929 to join the New York Nationals of the American Soccer League. In 1930, the Nationals were renamed the Giants and Lafferty played for them through the 1931 season. He was married with three children and retired to Kilsyth in Scotland.

References

External links
 

American Soccer League (1921–1933) players
Fulham F.C. players
King's Park F.C. players
New York Nationals (ASL) players
New York Giants (soccer, 1930–1932) players
Scottish footballers
Scottish expatriate footballers
St Johnstone F.C. players
1901 births
1970 deaths
English Football League players
Scottish Football League players
Association football wing halves
Scottish expatriate sportspeople in the United States
Expatriate soccer players in the United States